
Otto Friedrich Gruppe (15 April 1804 – 7 January 1876) was a German philosopher, scholar-poet and philologist who served as secretary of the Prussian Academy of Arts in Berlin. Poems by Gruppe were set to music by Johannes Brahms, Richard Strauss, Karl Löwe, Elise Schmezer, and Franz Schreker. He rediscovered the cycle of Latin elegies by the Augustan poet Sulpicia and demonstrated their poetic value.

As a philosopher, he reacted against Hegel, his teacher in Berlin; his work was attacked by Karl Marx, and severely criticised by others. But Gruppe was rediscovered as a philosopher by Fritz Mauthner in an article on Gruppe printed in Maximilian Harden's Die Zukunft 22 (Berlin, 1913). More recently, Gruppe has been interpreted as a precursor of Wittgenstein by Hans Sluga in 1980;  his Gegenwart und Zukunft der Philosophie in Deutschland (1855) was reprinted in 1996.

Gruppe was born in Danzig (Gdańsk) and died in Berlin. His son was the mythographer Otto Gruppe (1851–1901).

Notes

References
Ludwig Bernays (ed.), Otto Friedrich Gruppe 1804-1876: Philosoph, Dichter, Philologe. (Paradeigmata 3) (Freiburg-in-Breisgau: Rombach Verlag) 2004.    (Scholia review).

Further reading
Carl von Prantl (1879). Gruppe, Otto Friedrich. In: Allgemeine Deutsche Biographie (ADB). Band 10, Duncker & Humblot, Leipzig 
Fritz Mauthner (1913). Otto Friedrich Gruppe. In: Die Zukunft. Verlag Der Zukunft, Berlin, pp. 314–325
Jürgen von Kempski (1966). Gruppe, Otto Friedrich. In: Neue Deutsche Biographie (NDB). Band 7, Duncker & Humblot, Berlin, S. 235 f. (Digitalisat).
Hermann-Josef Cloeren (1967). Otto Friedrich Gruppe und die sprachanalytische Philosophie. PhD thesis, Universität Münster (Westfalen) 
Ludwig Bernays (ed.): Otto Friedrich Gruppe 1804–1876. Philosoph, Dichter, Philologe. Rombach, Freiburg (Breisgau) 2004,  (Paradeigmata vol. 3).

External links

1804 births
1876 deaths
German philosophers
19th-century German poets
German philologists
Writers from Gdańsk
People from West Prussia
German male poets
19th-century German male writers